A Perfect Gentleman (Swedish: En perfekt gentleman) is a 1927 Swedish silent drama film directed by Vilhelm Bryde and Gösta Ekman and starring Ekman, La Jana and Karin Swanström. It is sometimes also known by the alternative title of Husband by Proxy.

Cast
 Gösta Ekman as Marquis Robert de Luny & Jean Coubert  
 La Jana as Marquise Hortense 
 Karin Swanström as Charlotte Ponson  
 Hans Albers as Oberst Jacques Renard  
 Eric Bertner as Pierre  
 Otto Jacobsen as Marcel  
 Helga Brofeldt as Schwester Rosalie  
 Carl Browallius as Advokat Bonnard  
 Albert Ranft as Kartenspielender Herr  
 Oscar Byström as Ein älterer Mann 
 Gucken Cederborg as Ein Weib  
 Knut Lambert as Ein älterer Herr  
 Mia Sernquist as Eine alte Frau  
 Wilhelm Tunelli as Ein alter Mann 
 Ellen Adelstam as Eine alte Dame  
 Leo Golowin as Ein Herr  
 Ragnar Arvedson as Ein Mann  
 Ida Schylander as Ein Weib  
 Sture Baude as Ein Mann  
 Gerda Ström as Ein Weib  
 Seth Hesslin as Ein Mann  
 Gull Natorp
 Olga Andersson 
 Erik Bergman 
 Ragnar Billberg 
 Mia Gründer 
 Desdemona Schlichting

References

Bibliography
 Gunnar Iverson, Astrid Soderbergh Widding & Tytti Soila. Nordic National Cinemas. Routledge, 2005.

External links
 

1927 films
1927 drama films
1920s Swedish-language films
Swedish silent feature films
Swedish drama films
Swedish black-and-white films
Silent drama films
1920s Swedish films